Alexander Alexandrovich Dushkevich (20 September 1853 – 1918) was an Imperial Russian division and corps commander. He took part in the war against the Ottoman Empire and the Empire of Japan. He was promoted to major general in 1905 and lieutenant general in 1910. He fought against the German Empire on the Eastern Front.

Awards
Order of Saint Stanislaus (House of Romanov), 3rd class, 1878
Order of Saint Anna, 3rd class, 1888
Order of Saint Vladimir, 3rd class, 1904
Order of Saint George, 4th class, 1905
Order of Saint Stanislaus (House of Romanov), 1st class, 1907
Order of Saint Anna, 1st class, 1912
Order of Saint Vladimir, 2nd class, 1914
Order of the White Eagle (Russian Empire), 1915
Order of Saint Alexander Nevsky, 1916

Sources
 
 ДУШКЕВИЧЪ Александръ Александровичъ

Russian military personnel of the Russo-Turkish War (1877–1878)
Russian military personnel of the Russo-Japanese War
Russian military personnel of World War I
Recipients of the Order of Saint Stanislaus (Russian), 3rd class
Recipients of the Order of St. Anna, 3rd class
Recipients of the Order of St. Vladimir, 3rd class
Recipients of the Order of Saint Stanislaus (Russian), 1st class
Recipients of the Order of St. Anna, 1st class
Recipients of the Order of St. Vladimir, 2nd class
Recipients of the Order of the White Eagle (Russia)
1853 births
1918 deaths
Russian nobility